Looming is a term found in the study of perception, as it relates directly to psychology. Looming occurs when an object begins moving closer to the eye. As the resulting image becomes increasingly larger on the perceiver's retina, i.e., when an object looms, there is an automatic physiological response to perceive the object as an approaching object or surface, instead of one that is stationary or receding. Evidence indicates that looming perception is not limited to the visual modality, but can occur due to auditory or even tactile stimuli. 

There is a different type of mirage that is also described as looming, in which distant objects appear much nearer than they actually are. This is explained in the same way as the image of the ship, except that the image is not inverted; the variations in density may also act as a magnifying glass.

See also
 Motion camouflage
 Optic flow

References

Schiff, W., Caviness, J.A., & Gibson, J.J. "Persistent fear responses in rhesus monkeys to the optical stimulus of 'looming'." Science, 1962, 136, 982–983.
Schiff, W., "Perception of impending collision; a study of visually directed avoidant behavior." Psychological Monographs, 1965, 79 Whole #604.

Perception